Dichaetothrips is a genus of thrips in the family Phlaeothripidae.

Species
 Dichaetothrips brevicollis
 Dichaetothrips okajimai
 Dichaetothrips secutor
 Dichaetothrips senohi

References

Phlaeothripidae
Thrips
Thrips genera